
Year 365 BC was a year of the pre-Julian Roman calendar. At the time, it was known as the Year of the Consulship of Aventinensis and Ahala (or, less frequently, year 389 Ab urbe condita). The denomination 365 BC for this year has been used since the early medieval period, when the Anno Domini calendar era became the prevalent method in Europe for naming years.

Events 
 By place 
 Greece 
 Perdiccas III of Macedon, son of Amyntas III and Eurydice II, kills Ptolemy of Aloros, who has been the regent of Macedon since he arranged the assassination of Perdiccas III's brother Alexander II in 368 BC. With Ptolemy's death, Perdiccas III becomes King of Macedon in his own right.
 The Athenian forces under general Timotheus overrun Samos, then occupied by a Persian garrison, after a 10-month siege.

 Roman Republic 
 Etruscan actors stage the first theatrical performances in Rome.

Births

Deaths 
 Marcus Furius Camillus, Roman soldier and statesman. (b. c. 446 BC)
 Eurydice II, Macedonian queen and mother of Philip II of Macedon
 Antisthenes, Athenian philosopher (b. c. 445 BC)

References